Greatest Hits: 30 Years of Rock is a compilation album by George Thorogood and the Destroyers, released in 2004. The album celebrates 30 years of the band, and includes two tracks which are new versions of previously released hits.

The album peaked at number 55 on the US Billboard 200 and reached number one on the Recording Industry Association of New Zealand chart.

Track listing

Personnel 
 George Thorogood – vocals, guitar, harmonica
 Ron Smith – guitar
 Billy Blough – bass guitar
 Jeff Simon – drums
 John Nagy – engineer
 Artwork by Diana Barnes [art direction]
 Artwork by Don Bailey [design]
 Compilation producer  – Kevin Flaherty
 Executive producer – Mike Donahue
 Mastered by Terry Manning
 Producers – George Thorogood (tracks: 3, 4, 16), George Thorogood & The Destroyers (tracks: 1, 2, 5 to 15), Jim Gaines (tracks: 15), John Nagy (tracks: 3, 4, 16), Ken Irwin (tracks: 1 to 4, 16), Terry Manning (tracks: 6 to 14)
 Producer [Production Assistance] – John Nagy (tracks: 5), Ken Irwin (tracks: 5, 11)

References

External links 
 George Thorogood – Greatest Hits: 30 Years Of Rock. Georgethorogood.com.
 George Thorogood & The Destroyers – 30 Years Of Rock. Discogs.com.
 George Thorogood & The Destroyers – Greatest Hits: 30 Years Of Rock. Jbhifi.com.au

George Thorogood and the Destroyers albums
2004 greatest hits albums
Capitol Records compilation albums
Compilation albums by American artists